Senator Mann may refer to:

Charles A. Mann (1803–1860), New York State Senate
Curtis Mann (1815–1894), Wisconsin State Senate
Horace Mann (1796–1859), Massachusetts State Senate
James Mann (1822–1868), Maine State Senate
Job Mann (1795–1873), Pennsylvania State Senate
Joel Keith Mann (1780–1857), Pennsylvania State Senate
Kenny Mann (fl. 2010s), West Virginia State Senate
Thomas Mann (Iowa politician) (born 1949), Iowa State Senate
William Hodges Mann (1843–1927), Virginia State Senate